The Cheat is a 1912 Australian silent film directed by Alfred Rolfe. It is considered a lost film.

Synopsis
An Englishman is wrongly accused of a crime and flees to Australia. On the boat over he saves the life of a squatter's daughter when she falls overboard. In gratitude, the girl's father gives him a job on his station. The Englishman falls in love with the girl and they get engaged to be married. However he faces opposition from the station manager, who causes trouble for them. The climax involves a bushfire and "ride for life".

Cast
Ethel Phillip
Stanley Walpole
Charles Villiers

Release
The movie advertised the film as "teaming with sensational incidents and told in the picturesque surroundings of the Australian Bush."

According to the Adelaide Register "it is a particularly interesting film,the spectator with any sense of emotion is worked up to a high pitch of enthusiasm as the subject is being screened."

References

External links
 
The Cheat at AustLit

Australian black-and-white films
Lost Australian films
Films directed by Alfred Rolfe
1912 films
Australian silent feature films